Krisztián Veréb (26 July 1977 – 24 October 2020) was a Hungarian sprint canoer who competed in the late 1990s and early 2000s. He won a bronze medal in the K-2 1000 m event at the 2000 Summer Olympics in Sydney.

Veréb also won four medals at the ICF Canoe Sprint World Championships with two silvers (K-2 1000 m: 2001, K-4 1000 m: 2003) and two bronzes (K-2 1000 m: 1998, 2002).

Veréb died in a motorcycle accident in Santo Domingo, Dominican Republic on 24 October 2020. He was 43.

References

External links

Sports-reference.com profile

1977 births
2020 deaths
Canoeists at the 2000 Summer Olympics
Hungarian male canoeists
ICF Canoe Sprint World Championships medalists in kayak
Medalists at the 2000 Summer Olympics
Olympic canoeists of Hungary
Olympic bronze medalists for Hungary
Olympic medalists in canoeing
Road incident deaths in the Dominican Republic
Motorcycle road incident deaths
21st-century Hungarian people